Moechotypa delicatula is a species of beetle in the family Cerambycidae. It was described by White in 1858. It is known from China, Myanmar, Laos, India, Vietnam, and Sumatra.

References

delicatula
Beetles described in 1858